The Women's 500m Time Trial is one of the 9 women's events at the 2009 UCI Track Cycling World Championships, held in Pruszków, Poland.

23 Cyclists from 20 countries participated in the contest. The Final was held on 25 March.

World record

Final

References

Women's 500 m time trial
UCI Track Cycling World Championships – Women's 500 m time trial